Hirshberg is a surname. Notable people with the surname include:

Al Hirshberg (1909–1973), American author and sportswriter
Charles Hirshberg, American journalist
Gary Hirshberg (born 1952), American businessman
Glen Hirshberg (born 1966), American writer

See also
 Hirschberg (disambiguation)